The TREMEC TR-4050 is a 5-speed manual transmission for longitudinal engine rear wheel drive trucks.  It includes one overdrive gear and a light-weight aluminum housing.  It is manufactured by Transmission Technologies Corporation. New 4wd TR-4050 units are currently available in the United States through any Authorized Tremec Distributor.

Specifications for 4wd model TDET17341:

 Ratios: 6.16, 3.11, 1.71, 1.00, .76 Rev. 6.03
 600 LB-FT Rated 
 Chrysler/Jeep Transfer case bolt circle with 23 spline output shaft
 Oil Capacity - 3.67 QT
 Weighs 164 lbs
 19.5" overall length
 .590" GM pilot diameter with a .750" pilot on the optional Mopar input shaft
 1.125" Input shaft diameter, 10 spline, GM/Mopar lengths available

OE Applications
 Chevrolet Silverado C3500 HD
 Dodge Ram 3500 and 4000 (South American Market)
 Ford Super Duty F-350 (South American Market)

Retrofit Applications

 Chevrolet C/K K Models
 Dodge D Series W Models
 Ford Bronco 1966-1996 Full Size Bronco
 Ford F-Series
 Jeep CJ Jeep CJ-6, Jeep CJ-7, CJ-8 Scrambler
 Jeep Wrangler YJ, TJ, JK
 Jeep Cherokee SJ, XJ
 Jeep Wagoneer SJ, ZJ
 Jeep Gladiator SJ
 Land Rover Defender

References

External links
https://shiftsst.com/4wd

4050